The Church of Immaculate Heart of Mary is a Roman Catholic church in Vinkovci, Croatia.

History 

The church was built from 1973 till 1975.

It was damaged during the Croatian War of Independence, but later it was renovated.

References 

Churches in Croatia
Vinkovci
Roman Catholic churches in Vukovar-Syrmia County